Isuru is a village in Shimoga district of Karnataka state, India.

Location
Issuru village is located 46.6 km north of Shimoga town in southwestern Karnataka.
It is ten kilometers from the nearest town of Shikaripur. Issuru is administered from Shikarpur block office coming under Shimoga Tehsil.

Demographics
Issuru village has  4,674 people, according to the 2011 census.

History
In 1942, Issuru attracted national attention when the villagers declared independence of the village from the British government who ruled India at that time.  They blockaded the village and prevented the British officers from collecting tax.  In the confrontation that followed, two British officers were killed by the villagers and the criminal case registered culminated in the hanging of four freedom fighters.This incidence is also called chauri chaura of Karnataka.

References

Villages in Shimoga district